Camila Rajchman (born 26 November 1994) is an Uruguayan singer, songwriter, television host and panelist. Between 2014 and 2016 she was vocalist of the band Rombai.

Biography 
Camila Rajchman was born in Montevideo, Uruguay to a Jewish family. She is the daughter of Gabriela and José Rajchman, and granddaughter of Chil Rajchman, a Holocaust survivor. She studies communication at the ORT University.

In 2014, with Fer Vázquez and other friends, they created the cumbia pop band Rombai. In principle it was only a group of classmates who studied communication at the ORT University who joined to create a band, and then had a reputation and popularity that they did not think they were going to have, presenting shows throughout Latin America.

In 2016 a documentary entitled Marama–Rombai – El viaje was released, in which the history of both bands is told. Also in that year she was a panelist for the Argentine reality show Big Brother. She announced her departure from Rombai in March 2016 and on April 29 of that year she presented herself for the last time with the group at Luna Park in Buenos Aires. She was replaced by the Argentine singer Emilia Mernes.

In 2017 she joined for two months, the panel of the morning television show Desayunos informales, as a replacement panelist for Andy Vila. After a few months, she began to be the show's reporter, the position she holds until today. In 2021 she joined the culinary competition Fuego Sagrado as the community manager. In 2022 she joined ¿Quién es la máscara? as the backstage host, and began hosting game show El Último Pasajero with Jorge Echagüe.

Filmography

Film roles

Television roles

References

External links 

 

 

Living people
1994 births
21st-century Uruguayan women singers
Uruguayan singer-songwriters
Uruguayan television people
People from Montevideo
Uruguayan people of Polish-Jewish descent
Uruguayan Jews